Eadulf Rus (fl. 1080) was an 11th-century Northumbrian noble, and the first recorded 'of Swinton'. He was either the son or grandson of Gospatric (son of Uhtred the Bold), possibly the man who soon after Christmas 1064 was allegedly killed on behalf of Tostig, Earl of Northumbria. This murder by Tostig led to a great northern revolt against Edward the Confessor, a revolt that turned both King Edward and Harold Godwinson against Tostig and led to the appointment of the Mercian, Morcar, as Earl of northern England.

Eadulf is primarily remembered for his involvement in the death of Walcher, Earl of Northumbria and Bishop of Durham. The sources says that the attack occurred as revenge for the murder of Walcher's English right-hand man, Ligulf. Ligulf had been connected into the Bamburgh kindred marrying, according to the Historia Regum, Ealdgyth daughter of Ealdred, Earl of Bamburgh.

The Worcester Chronicle and the Historia Regum allege that the murder of Ligulf was planned by Walcher's chaplain Leobwin after Ligulf had argued with him during one of the earl's councils. It was Walcher's kinsman Gilbert, however, who is alleged to have entered Ligulf's hall, and attacked and killed him. Kapelle thought that, perhaps due to his failure to protect Northumberland against the Scots in 1079, Walcher's relations with Ligulf broke down, leading to the loss of Ligulf's support and then to hostility.

On 14 May 1080 a party of Northumbrian natives attacked that bishop-earl and his household at Gateshead, across the river from the future site of Newcastle-Upon-Tyne, having arrived to hold discussions. The discussions were fruitless and Walcher, who was protected with 100 knights, retired to the church there. The Northumbrians set the church on fire, after Leobwin refused to surrender himself. Walcher was forced out and stabbed with swords. Leobwin was burned to death.

De primo Saxonum adventu says that the leader was Eadulf, son of Gospatric; the Historia Regum also names, Eadulf cognomento Rus as the killer, but claims he was a grandson of Gospatric through another Uhtred. The Libellus de exordio says that killer was a man named Waltheof, though this Waltheof may have been Eadulf's brother.

According to the Historia Regum Eadulf was killed soon after the death of Walcher, slain by a woman. His body was buried in the church at Jedburgh (now Scottish Borders), until Prior Turgot of Durham Cathedral had it removed a few years later. Eadulf may have had a brother named Dolfin in addition to a brother named Waltheof.

Notes

References

External links
 

11th-century births
1080s deaths
Anglo-Saxon people
History of County Durham
History of Northumberland
People associated with the Scottish Borders
11th-century English people